Edward Glenn "Fireball" Roberts Jr. (January 20, 1929July 2, 1964) was an American stock car racer.

Background
Roberts was born in Tavares, Florida, and raised in Apopka, Florida, where he was interested in both auto racing and baseball.  He was a pitcher for the Zellwood Mud Hens, an American Legion baseball team, where he earned the nickname, "Fireball" because of his fastball.  He enlisted with the United States Army Air Corps in 1945, but was discharged after basic training because of his asthma.

Racing career

He attended the University of Florida and raced on dirt tracks on weekends.  In 1947, at the age of eighteen, he raced on the Daytona Beach Road Course at Daytona, for the first time.  He won a 150-mile race at Daytona Beach the following year. Roberts also competed in local stock and modified races at Florida tracks such as Seminole Speedway.

"Fireball" Roberts continued to amass victories on the circuit, despite the changes in NASCAR, as it moved away from shorter dirt tracks to superspeedways in the 1950s and 1960s. In his 206 career NASCAR Grand National races, he won 33 times and had 32 poles.  He finished in the top-five 45 percent of the time, and in the top-ten 59 percent of the time. He won both the Daytona 500 and Firecracker 250 events in 1962, driving a black and gold 1962 Pontiac built by car builder legend, Smokey Yunick. He also designed Augusta International Raceway, where he would last win.

Between 1962 and 1964, Roberts competed in multiple major sports car races, including a class win at the 1962 24 Hours of Le Mans driving a Ferrari 250 GTO entered by North American Racing Team.

Labor union
In 1961, Roberts, temporary president of the Federation of Professional Athletes, was in dispute with NASCAR president, Bill France, over the Teamsters' Union affiliate – the FPA – which he and Curtis Turner had helped organize and which France was trying to disband. Unlike the banned Curtis Turner and Tim Flock, Roberts soon returned to the NASCAR fold.

Death
On May 24, 1964, at the World 600 in Charlotte, Roberts had qualified in the eleventh position and started in the middle of the pack.  On lap seven, Ned Jarrett and Junior Johnson collided and spun out and Roberts crashed trying to avoid them.  Roberts' Ford slammed backward into the inside retaining wall, flipped over, and burst into flames. Witnesses at the track claimed they heard Roberts screaming, "Ned, help me", from inside his burning car after the wreck. Jarrett rushed to save Roberts as his car was engulfed by the flames. Roberts suffered second-and third-degree burns over eighty percent of his body and was airlifted to a hospital in critical condition. Although it was thought that Roberts had an allergic reaction to flame-retardant chemicals, he was secretly an asthmatic, and the chemicals affected his breathing.

Roberts was able to survive for several weeks, and it appeared he might pull through, but he took a turn for the worse on June 30, 1964.  He contracted pneumonia and sepsis and had slipped into a coma by the next day. Roberts died from his burns on July 2, 1964.

Roberts' death, as well as the deaths of Eddie Sachs and Dave MacDonald at the Indianapolis 500, six days after Roberts' crash, led to an increase in research on fire-retardant uniforms. It also led to the development of the Firestone RaceSafe fuel cell. Modern race cars use a foam-filled fuel cell to prevent fuel spillage of the magnitude of Roberts car. Also, fully fire-retardant coveralls would be phased in, leading to mandatory Nomex racing suits. Roberts had lost his close friend, Joe Weatherly, in January 1964 at the Motor Trend 500, at Riverside, California.

Many sources reported that Roberts was planning to retire since he had taken a public relations position at the Falstaff Brewing Company and that the race in which he was killed was to be one of the final races of his career.

Legacy
Despite having his career cut short and having never won a Grand National title, Roberts was named one of NASCAR's 50 Greatest Drivers. Other career accolades he won include induction into the International Motorsports Hall of Fame in 1990, and the Motorsports Hall of Fame of America in 1995. In 2000, the city of Concord, North Carolina, named a street near Charlotte Motor Speedway in his honor. 

After Roberts' death, NASCAR mandated that all drivers wear flame retardant coveralls while on track. They also instituted the five-point safety harness, and the special, contoured driver's seat, as requirements for all NASCAR vehicles.

The "Fireball Run", named for Roberts, was started in 2007.  This streaming TV "adventurally" series, headquartered at Universal Studios in Florida, covers 40 teams as they compete in an 8-day, 2000 mile race and life-sized trivia game to raise money for missing and exploited children organizations.  The Fireball Run is credited with assisting in the recovery of 38 missing children.

In 2013 Roberts was nominated for induction in the NASCAR Hall of Fame in Charlotte, North Carolina, and he was included in the 2014 induction ceremony.

Motorsports career results

NASCAR
(key) (Bold – Pole position awarded by qualifying time. Italics – Pole position earned by points standings or practice time. * – Most laps led. ** – All laps led.)

Grand National Series

Daytona 500

References

External links
 "Fireball" Roberts web site 
 Glenn "Fireball" Roberts at NASCAR.com
 Glenn "Fireball" Roberts at the International Motorsports Hall of Fame
 Glenn "Fireball" Roberts website and career stats by son-in-law
 
 

1929 births
1964 deaths
24 Hours of Le Mans drivers
Burials in Florida
Deaths from sepsis
Filmed deaths in motorsport
International Motorsports Hall of Fame inductees
NASCAR drivers
People from Apopka, Florida
People from Tavares, Florida
Racing drivers from Florida
Racing drivers who died while racing
Sports deaths in North Carolina
Sportspeople from Seminole County, Florida
University of Florida alumni
World Sportscar Championship drivers
Deaths from pneumonia in North Carolina
United States Army Air Forces personnel of World War II
NASCAR Hall of Fame inductees